Saint Joseph is a ghost town in Clark County, Nevada, that was located on the east bank of the Muddy River west of the north end of the Perkins Field in the Moapa Valley.

History
Saint Joseph was established in 1865, on the east bank of the Muddy River, five miles north of Overton, Nevada.  The settlement was named for Joseph W. Young, one of the colonists and a son of Brigham Young. Its post office in Paiute County, Arizona, was established August 26, 1867.  Saint Joseph was burned down in 1868 and its original site was abandoned, the population, post office and the town name moved to the settlement of West Point what is now Logandale, Nevada.

The new Saint Joseph like the other Mormon settlements in the Moapa Valley was abandoned in 1871 due to a tax dispute with the state of Nevada.  Its post office closed in October 1871.  However it became active again in May 1876.  Following the Mormon return to Overton in 1880, in November 1883 the post office operations were closed at Saint Joseph and moved to Overton.

Today
The site of the original Saint Joseph is barren.

References 

 

Ghost towns in Clark County, Nevada
History of the Mojave Desert region
Populated places established in 1865
1865 establishments in Arizona Territory
Ghost towns in Nevada
Arizona Territory